Tontitown is a city in northern Washington County, Arkansas, United States. The community is located in the Ozark Mountains and was founded by Italian settlers in 1898. Known for its grapes and wines, Tontitown has hosted the Tontitown Grape Festival continuously since 1898. It is part of the Northwest Arkansas region, serving as a bedroom community for larger neighbors Fayetteville and Springdale. The town experienced a 160% growth in population between the 2000 and 2010 censuses.

History
Led by Catholic priest Pietro Bandini, who eventually became mayor of the city, Italian settlers working on Lakeport Plantation in the Arkansas delta moved to northwest Arkansas and found the climate and terrain similar to their native Northern Italy. Tontitown was settled in 1898 and named for Italian explorer Henri de Tonti.

The 35 initial families settled on  plots, planting gardens and vineyards. Some residents resisted and resented the Italian influx, which largely spoke Italian and remained insulated. After threats and arson of barns and the school, Bandini confronted a group to stop the terrorization of the nascent Tontitown community.

The Tontitown grapes eventually became a major crop in Washington County following the construction of a Welch Company plant in Springdale near the railroad. The area also grew apples, blackberries, peaches, strawberries, and tomatoes for canning in Springdale.

Geography
Tontitown is located at  (36.179043, -94.246572).

Demographics

2020 census

As of the 2020 United States census, there were 4,301 people, 1,399 households, and 1,060 families residing in the city.

2010 census
As of the 2010 census the ethnic and racial composition of the population was 92.0% non-Hispanic white, 0.3% African-American, 0.5% Native American, 0.6% Asian, 2.4% reporting two or more races and 5.7% Hispanic.

2000 census
At the 2000 census there were 942 people in 351 households, including 273 families, in the city. The racial makeup of the city was 96.28% White, 1.70% Native American, 0.11% Pacific Islander, 0.85% from other races, and 1.06% from two or more races. 2.23%. were Hispanic or Latino of any race.

Of the 351 households 37.9% had children under the age of 18 living with them, 66.4% were married couples living together, 7.4% had a female householder with no husband present, and 22.2% were non-families. 18.5% of households were one person and 9.1% were one person aged 65 or older. The average household size was 2.68 and the average family size was 3.07. Tontitown has seen a very rapid growth in recent years as indicated by a 160% growth in population between the 2000 and 2010 censuses.

The age distribution was 27.0% under the age of 18, 6.5% from 18 to 24, 29.7% from 25 to 44, 24.6% from 45 to 64, and 12.2% 65 or older. The median age was 37 years. For every 100 females, there were 100.0 males. For every 100 females age 18 and over, there were 97.1 males. Tonitown is part of the Fayetteville, Springdale, Rogers metro area.

The median household income was $43,750 and the median family income  was $47,589. Males had a median income of $32,917 versus $25,750 for females. The per capita income for the city was $20,058.  About 4.9% of families and 8.7% of the population were below the poverty line, including 10.7% of those under age 18 and 6.9% of those age 65 or over.

Culture
The city is known regionally for the Tontitown Grape Festival. Started in 1898 as a harvest festival to celebrate the settlement's establishment, a spaghetti and fried chicken dinner continues the tradition.

Many original families remain in Tontitown or nearby Springdale.

Education
It is in the Springdale School District.

Jim Rollins Elementary School a.k.a. Jim D. Rollins School of Innovation, a part of the Springdale district, is in Tontitown. It uses an open classroom instructional model from New Zealand. Planning for the school began circa 2018 In October 2020 the district began building the school, which opened in fall 2021, though with some construction left unfinished. The dedication occurred in 2022. The school was named after a person who served as the superintendent of the Springdale district. 

In 2022 much of Tontitown is zoned to Jim D. Rollins Elementary in Tontitown (areas south of 412) and Shaw Elementary School in Springdale (areas north of 412), with some areas in the east zoned to Bernice Young Elementary School.  All of Tontitown is zoned to Hellstern Middle School, Central Junior High School, and Har-Ber High School, all in Springdale.

Most of the community, in 2006, was zoned to Bernice Young Elementary School, with a portion zoned to Walker Elementary School. Tontitown was divided between Hellstern and Helen Tyson middle schools, and Central and Southwest junior high schools. All portions were zoned to Har-Ber.

Ozark Catholic Academy, a Roman Catholic high school, is in Tontitown.

Notable people
Pietro Bandini (1852–1917), town founder and mayor
Albert Lewis Fletcher, former Roman Catholic Bishop of Little Rock from 1947 to 1972, resided in Tontitown during his childhood.
Jerry E. Hinshaw, member of the Arkansas House of Representatives from 1981 to 1996, resided in Tontitown.
The Duggar family, reality TV stars reside in Tontitown.

See also

 St. Joseph Catholic Church (Tontitown, Arkansas)
 Tontitown School Building

References

External links
 

Cities in Arkansas
Cities in Washington County, Arkansas
Northwest Arkansas
Italian-American culture in Arkansas
1898 establishments in Arkansas